The Battle of Messines (7–14 June 1917) was an attack by the British Second Army (General Sir Herbert Plumer), on the Western Front, near the village of Messines (now Mesen) in West Flanders, Belgium, during the First World War. The Nivelle Offensive in April and May had failed to achieve its more grandiose aims, had led to the demoralisation of French troops and confounded the Anglo-French strategy for 1917. The attack forced the Germans to move reserves to Flanders from the Arras and Aisne fronts, relieving pressure on the French.

The British tactical objective was to capture the German defences on the ridge, which ran from Ploegsteert Wood (Plugstreet to the British) in the south, through Messines and Wytschaete to Mt Sorrel, depriving the German 4th Army of the high ground. The ridge gave commanding views of the British defences and back areas of Ypres to the north, from which the British intended to conduct the Northern Operation, an advance to Passchendaele Ridge and then the capture of the Belgian coast up to the Dutch frontier. The Second Army had five corps, three for the attack and two on the northern flank not part of the operation; XIV Corps was in General Headquarters reserve. The 4th Army divisions of Group Wytschaete (the IX Reserve Corps headquarters) held the ridge and were later reinforced by a division from Group Ypres.

The British attacked with the II Anzac Corps (3rd Australian Division, New Zealand Division and the 25th Division, with the 4th Australian Division in reserve), IX Corps (36th (Ulster), 16th (Irish) and 19th (Western) divisions and the 11th (Northern) Division in reserve), X Corps (41st, 47th (1/2nd London) and 23rd Divisions with the 24th Division in reserve). XIV Corps in reserve (Guards, 1st, 8th and 32nd divisions). The 24th Saxon Division, relieved on 5 June, was rushed back when the attack began and the 11th Division, in  reserve, arrived on 8 June.

The battle began with the detonation of nineteen mines beneath the German front position, which devastated it and left large craters. The effect of the British mines, barrages and bombardments was improved by advances in artillery survey, flash spotting and centralised control of artillery from the Second Army headquarters. British attacks from 8 to 14 June advanced the front line beyond the former German  (Chord Position, the Oosttaverne Line to the British). The battle was a prelude to the much larger Third Battle of Ypres, the preliminary bombardment for which began on 11 July 1917.

Background

British plans 1916–1917
In 1916, the British planned to clear the Germans from the Belgian coast to deny them the use of the ports as naval bases. In January, Plumer recommended to Field Marshal Sir Douglas Haig the capture of Messines Ridge (part of the southern arc of the Ypres Salient) before an operation to capture the Gheluvelt plateau further north. The highest ground north of the Messines–Wytschaete ridge lies on the Menin road, between Hooge and Veldhoek,  from Gheluvelt, at the west end of the main Ypres ridge, which runs from Ypres, east to Broodseinde and then north-east to Passchendaele, Westroosebeek and Staden. The British called it the Gheluvelt Plateau or Menin Ridge. Roads and tracks converged on the Menin road at this point (Clapham Junction to the British). The east end of the Gheluvelt plateau was on the west side of Polygon Wood. The spur widened to almost  between Veldhoek and Gheluvelt.

A Flanders campaign was postponed because of the Battle of Verdun in 1916 and the demands of the Battle of the Somme. When it became apparent that the Second Battle of the Aisne (the main part of the Nivelle Offensive, 16 April to 9 May 1917) had failed to achieve its most ambitious objectives, Haig instructed the Second Army to capture the Messines–Wytschaete Ridge as soon as possible. British operations in Flanders would relieve pressure on the French Armies on the Aisne, where demoralisation amid the failure of the Nivelle Offensive had led to mutinies. The capture of Messines Ridge would give the British control of the tactically important ground on the southern flank of the Ypres Salient, shorten the front and deprive the Germans of observation over British positions further north. The British would gain observation of the southern slope of Menin Ridge at the west end of the Gheluvelt plateau, ready for the Northern Operation.

The front line around Ypres had changed little since the end of the Second Battle of Ypres ( May 1915). The British held the city and the Germans held the high ground of the Messines–Wytschaete Ridge to the south, the lower ridges to the east and the flat ground to the north. The Ypres front was a salient bulging into the German lines and was overlooked by German artillery observers on the higher ground. The British had little ground observation of the German rear areas and valleys east of the ridges.

Underneath the soil is London clay, sand and silt. According to the Commonwealth War Graves Commission criteria of "sand", "sandy soils" and "well-balanced soils", Messines Ridge is "well-balanced soil", drained by many streams, canals and ditches, which needed regular maintenance. Since the First Battle of Ypres in 1914, much of the drainage in the area had been destroyed by artillery-fire, although some repairs had been achieved by army Land Drainage Companies brought from England. The area was considered by the British to be drier than Loos, Givenchy-lès-la-Bassée (Givenchy) and Plugstreet (Ploegsteert) Wood further south.

Prelude

British preparations

The Second Army centralised its artillery and devised a plan of great sophistication, following the precedent set at the Battle of Arras in April. The use of field survey, gun calibration, weather data and a new and highly accurate  map, much improved artillery accuracy. Systematic target-finding was established by the use of new sound-ranging equipment, better organisation of flash-spotting and the communication of results through the Army Report Centre at Locre Château. A survey of captured ground after the battle found that  of the German artillery positions had been plotted. The 2nd Field Survey Company also assisted mining companies by establishing the positions of objectives within the German lines, using intersection and a special series of aerial photographs. The company surveyed advanced artillery positions for guns to be moved forward to them and open fire as soon as they arrived.

Sub-surface conditions were especially complex and separate ground water tables made mining difficult. Two military geologists assisted the miners from March 1916, including Edgeworth David, who planned the system of mines. The British diverted the attention of German miners from their deepest galleries by making many secondary attacks in the upper levels.

The British knew of the importance the Germans placed on holding the  salient, after a captured corps order from  stating "that the salient be held at all costs" was received by Haig on 1 June. In the week before the attack,  and howitzers bombarded the German trenches, cut wire, destroyed strongpoints and conducted counter-battery fire against  German artillery pieces, using  The 4th Army artillery consisted of   fifty-four  twenty-four  guns,   and four heavy  and  guns.

In May, the 4th Australian Division, 11th (Northern) Division and the 24th Division were transferred from Arras as reserve divisions for the Second Army corps in the attack on Messines Ridge. Seventy-two of the new Mark IV tanks also arrived in May and were hidden south-west of Ypres. British aircraft began to move north from the Arras front, the total rising to about  aircraft in the II Brigade RFC (Second Army) area. The mass of artillery to be used in the attack was supported by many artillery-observation and photographic reconnaissance aircraft, in the corps squadrons which had been increased from twelve to eighteen aircraft each. Wire-cutting bombardments began on 21 May and two days were added to the bombardment for more counter-battery fire. The main bombardment began on 31 May, with only one day of poor weather before the attack. Two flights of each observation squadron concentrated on counter-battery observation and one became a bombardment flight, working with particular artillery bombardment groups for wire cutting and trench-destruction; these flights were to become contact-patrols to observe the positions of British troops once the assault began. The attack barrage was rehearsed on 3 June to allow British air observers to plot masked German batteries, which mainly remained hidden but many minor flaws in the British barrage were reported. A repeat performance on 5 June, induced a larger number of hidden German batteries to reveal themselves.

The advance would begin up a short rise to the near edge of the Steenbeek Valley, then up the steep rise from the valley floor between Hell and Sloping Roof farms to Four Huns, Chest and Middle farms on the main ridge, with Lumm Farm on the left flank of the objective. Artillery emplacements for the 25th divisional artillery and 112th Army Field Brigade were built and the Guards Division field artillery was placed in concealed forward positions. Road making and the construction of dugouts and communication trenches took place first between 12 and 30 April and then between 11 May and 6 June. In three hours, an assembly trench was dug  from the German front line on the night of  complete with communication trenches and barbed wire.

Large numbers of posts for machine-guns to fire an overhead barrage were built and protective pits were dug for mules, each of which was to carry  rounds of ammunition to advanced troops. (Machine-guns were fired like artillery, over the heads of the advancing infantry. The bullets of an overhead barrage came down ahead of the attacking troops on German-held areas, forcing the garrison under cover.) Three field companies of engineers with a pioneer battalion were kept in reserve, to follow up the attacking infantry, rebuild roads and work on defensive positions as ground was consolidated. The divisional artillery devised a creeping and standing barrage plan and time-table, tailored to the estimated rates of advance of the infantry. The standing barrage lifts were to keep all trenches within  of the infantry under continuous fire. The  howitzer,  howitzer and  howitzers involved, were to change targets only when infantry got within . The 18-pounder field gun standing barrages would then jump over the creeping barrages to the next series of objectives.

The 47th (1/2nd London) Division planned to attack with two brigades, each reinforced by a battalion from the reserve brigade, along either side of the Ypres–Comines Canal. Large numbers of machine-guns were organised to fire offensive and defensive barrages and signal detachments were organised to advance with the infantry. An observation balloon was reserved for messages by signal lamp from the front line, as insurance against the failure of telephone lines and message-runners. The divisional trench mortar batteries were to bombard the German front line opposite the 142nd Brigade, where it was too close for the artillery to shell without endangering British troops. Wire-cutting began in mid-May, against considerable local retaliation by German artillery. At the end of May the two attacking brigades went to Steenvoorde to train on practice courses built to resemble the German positions, using air reconnaissance photographs to mark the positions of machine-gun posts and hidden barbed wire. Divisional intelligence summaries were used to plan the capture of German company and battalion headquarters. On 1 June, the British artillery began the intense stage of the preparatory bombardment for trench-destruction and wire cutting; the two attacking brigades assembled for the attack from 4 to 6 June.

British fighter aircraft tried to prevent German artillery-observation aircraft from operating by dominating the air from the British front line to the German balloon line, about  beyond. Better aircraft like the Bristol Fighter, S.E.5a and the Royal Naval Air Service (RNAS) Sopwith Triplane had entered service since Arras and matched the performance of German Albatros D.III and Halberstadt D.II fighters. No British corps aircraft were shot down by German aircraft until 7 June, when  aircraft were able to direct artillery fire simultaneously over the three attacking corps. Behind the barrage line lay a second line of defence, which used wireless interception to take bearings on German artillery-observation aircraft to guide British aircraft into areas where German flights were most frequent. By June 1917, each British army had a control post of two aeroplane compass stations and an aeroplane intercepting station, linked by telephone to the army wing headquarters, fighter squadrons, the anti-aircraft commander and the corps heavy artillery headquarters.

The new anti-aircraft communication links allowed areas threatened by German bombardment to be warned, German artillery spotting aircraft to be attacked and German artillery batteries to be fired on when they revealed themselves. From 1 to 7 June, the II Brigade RFC had  from wireless interception, shot down one German aircraft, damaged seven and stopped  artillery bombardments. Normal offensive patrols continued beyond the barrage line out to a line from Ypres to Roulers and Menin, where large formations of British and German aircraft clashed in long dogfights, once German air reinforcements began operating in the area. Longer-range bombing and reconnaissance flights concentrated on German-occupied airfields and railway stations and the night bombing specialists of 100 Squadron attacked trains around Lille, Courtrai, Roulers and Comines. Two squadrons were reserved for close air support on the battlefield and low attacks on German airfields.

Plan

Three intermediate objectives, originally to be reached a day at a time, became halts, where fresh infantry would leap-frog through to gain the ridge in one day. In the afternoon a further advance down the ridge was to be made. The attack was to be conducted by three corps of the Second Army (General Sir Herbert Plumer). The corps planned their attacks under the supervision of the army commander, using analyses of the Somme operations of 1916 and successful features of the attack at Arras on 9 April as guides. Great care was taken in the planning of counter-battery fire, the artillery barrage time-table and machine-gun barrages.

German artillery positions and the second (Contour Position) position were not visible to British ground observers. For observation over the rear slopes of the ridge,  were concentrated in II Brigade RFC and eight balloons of II Kite Balloon Wing were placed  behind the British front line. The Second Army artillery commander, Major-General George Franks, co-ordinated the corps artillery plans, particularly the heavy artillery arrangements to suppress German artillery, which were devised by the corps and divisional artillery commanders. The Second Army Report Centre at Locre Château was linked by buried cable to each corps report centre, corps heavy artillery headquarters, divisional artillery headquarters, RFC squadrons, balloon headquarters, survey stations and wireless stations.

Responsibility for counter-battery fire was given to a counter-battery staff officer with a small staff, who concentrated exclusively on the defeat of the German artillery. A conference was held each evening by the counter-battery staffs of divisions and corps, methodically to collate the day's reports from observation aircraft and balloons, field survey companies, sound ranging sections and forward observation officers. Each corps had a counter-battery area, which was divided into zones and allotted to heavy artillery groups. Each heavy artillery group headquarters divided their zones into map squares, which were allotted to artillery batteries, to be ready swiftly to open fire on them.

The attacking corps organised their heavy artillery within the army plan according to local conditions. II Anzac Corps created four counter-battery groups, each with one heavy artillery group and IX Corps arranged four similar groups and five bombardment groups, one for each of its three divisions and two (with the heaviest howitzers) in reserve, under the control of the corps heavy artillery commander. A Heavy Artillery Group Commander was attached to each divisional artillery headquarters, to command the heavy artillery once the infantry attack began. Field artillery arrangements within corps also varied, in IX Corps groups and sub-groups were formed so that infantry brigades had an artillery liaison officer and two sub-groups, one with six  batteries and one with six  batteries. Surplus field artillery brigade headquarters planned forward moves for the guns and were kept ready to replace casualties. It was expected that much of the artillery would need to switch rapidly from the bombardment plan to engage counter-attacking German infantry. It was planned that the Forward Observation Officers of the divisions in the first attack onto the ridge would control the artillery which had remained in place and the reserve divisions advancing down the far slope to the Oosttaverne line would control the artillery hidden close to the front line and the artillery which advanced into no-man's-land.

Franks planned to neutralise German guns within  of the attack front. The  guns in the path of the attack were each to be engaged by a British gun, a formula which required  guns and howitzers to be reserved for counter-battery fire. Every  of front had a medium or heavy howitzer for bombardment, which required , with  guns and howitzers (five per cent) deployed with the field artillery that was due to fire the creeping and standing barrages. Franks devised a bombardment timetable and added arrangements for a massed machine-gun barrage.

Each division was given four extra batteries of field artillery, which could be withdrawn from the barrage at the divisional commander's discretion to engage local targets. The field batteries of the three reserve divisions were placed in camouflaged positions close to the British front line. As each objective was taken by the infantry, the creeping barrage was to pause  ahead and become a standing barrage while the infantry consolidated. During this time the pace of fire was to slacken to one round per-gun per-minute, allowing the gun-crews a respite, before resuming full intensity as the barrage moved on.

At  the mines were to be detonated, followed by the attack of nine divisions onto the ridge. The blue line (first objective) was to be occupied by  followed by a two-hour pause. At  the advance to the black line (second objective) would begin and consolidation was to start by  Fresh troops from the unengaged brigades of the attacking divisions or from the reserve divisions would then pass through, to attack the Oosttaverne line at  As soon as the black line was captured, all guns were to bombard the Oosttaverne line, conduct counter-battery fire and place a standing barrage beyond the black line.

German preparations

The first section began  behind Messines Ridge, running north from the Lys to Linselles then Werviq and Beselare, where the nearest areas giving good artillery observation to the west were found. In April, Field Marshal Crown Prince Rupprecht and his chief of staff,  (Lieutenant-General) Hermann von Kuhl, favoured withdrawal to the Warneton (third) line, before a British attack. The local divisional commanders objected, due to their belief that counter-mining had neutralised the British underground threat and the inadequacy of the Warneton line. The convex eastern slope limited artillery observation and the  canal and the river Lys restricted the space below the ridge where infantry could manoeuvre for counter-attacks. British observation from the ridge would make the ground to the east untenable as far as the   beyond.

 of the 4th Army, with three divisions under the command of the headquarters of XIX Corps (General Maximilian von Laffert), held the ridge and was reinforced with the 24th Division in early May. The 24th Division to the south held  and the 2nd Division at  held . In the south-east,  of the front line either side of the river Douve, was defended by the 40th Division. The front-line was lightly held, with fortifications distributed up to  behind the front line. At the end of May, British artillery fire was so damaging that the 24th and 40th divisions were relieved by the 35th and 3rd Bavarian divisions, which were replaced by the 7th and 1st Guard Reserve divisions in early June; relief of the 2nd Division was promised for  June.

About  posts per regimental sector were dispersed around the defensive zone. If they had to fall back, the support battalions would advance to restore the front system, except at Spanbroekmolen Hill, which due to its importance was to be held at all costs.

On 8 May, the British preliminary bombardment began and on 23 May became much heavier. The breastworks of the front defences were demolished and concrete shelters on both sides of the ridge were systematically destroyed. Air superiority allowed the British artillery observation aircraft to cruise over the German defences, despite the efforts of Jagdgeschwader 1 (the Richthofen Circus). On 26 May, the German front garrisons were ordered to move forward  into shell-holes in no-man's-land at dawn and return to their shelters at night. When the shelters were destroyed, shell-hole positions were made permanent, as were those of the companies further back.

Some German troops on the ridge were convinced of the mine danger and their morale was depressed further by the statement of a prisoner taken on 6 June, that the attack would be synchronised with mine explosions. On 1 June, the British bombardment became more intense and nearly every German defensive position on the forward slope was obliterated. The  (German air service) effort reached its maximum on 4 and 5 June, when German aircraft observed  counter-battery shoots and wireless interception by the British showed  German aircraft, escorted by up to seven fighters each, directing artillery fire against the Second Army. Long-range fire on Comines, Warneton, Wervicq and villages, road junctions, railways and bridges caused much damage and a number of ammunition dumps were destroyed.

Battle

Second Army

There was a thunderstorm in the evening of 6 June but by midnight the sky had cleared and at  British aircraft cruised over the German lines to camouflage the sound of tanks as they drove to their starting points. By  the attacking troops had reached their jumping-off positions unnoticed, except for some in the II Anzac Corps area.

Routine British artillery night firing stopped around half an hour before dawn and birdsong could be heard. At  the mines began to detonate. After the explosions, the British artillery began to fire at maximum rate. The nine attacking divisions and the three in reserve began their advance as the German artillery reply came scattered and late, falling on British assembly trenches after they had been vacated.

First objective (blue line)
The II Anzac Corps objective was the southern part of the ridge and Messines village. The 3rd Australian Division on the right, had been disorganised by a German gas bombardment on Ploegsteert (Plugstreet to the British) Wood around midnight, which caused  during the approach march but the attack between St Yves and the river Douve began on time. The craters disrupted the Australian attack formation, some infantry lines merging into a wave before reforming as they advanced. The two attacking brigades crossed the dry riverbed of the Steenebeke and took the German front line, despite the mine at La Petite Douve Farm not being fired and then advanced towards Messines village. On the left of the corps, the 25th Division began its advance  further back than the New Zealand Division but quickly caught up, helped by the mine at Ontario Farm.

On the right of IX Corps, the 36th (Ulster) Division attack on the front of the 107th Brigade, was supported by three mines at Kruisstraat and the big mine at Spanbroekmolen,  further north. The 109th Brigade on the left was helped by a mine at Peckham House and the devastated area was crossed without resistance, as German survivors in the area had been stunned by the mine explosions. The 16th (Irish) Division attacked between Maedelstede Farm and the Vierstraat–Wytschaete road. The mines at Maedelstede and the two at Petit Bois devastated the defence; the mines at Petit Bois on the left were about  late and knocked over some of the advancing British infantry. On the left of IX Corps, the 19th Division, north of the  road, attacked with two brigades into the remains of Grand Bois and Bois Quarante. Three mine explosions at Hollandscheschuur allowed the infantry to take a dangerous salient at Nag's Nose, as German survivors surrendered or retreated.

The German defences had been strengthened and had about double the normal infantry garrison. The German artillery concentration around Zandvoorde made a British attack in the area highly vulnerable but the British counter-battery effort suppressed the German artillery, its replies being late and ragged. On the night of  gaps were cut in the British wire to allow the troops to assemble in no-man's-land, ready to attack at 

The 41st Division attacked with two brigades past a mine under the St Eloi salient, finding the main obstacle to be wreckage caused by the explosion. The 47th and 23rd divisions formed the left defensive flank of the attack, advancing onto the ridge around the Ypres–Comines canal and railway, past the mines at Caterpillar and Hill 60. Soft ground in the valley south of Mt Sorrel, led the two infantry brigades of the 23rd Division to advance on either side up to the near crest of the ridge, arriving while the ground still shook from the mines at 

In the areas of the mine explosions, the British infantry found dead, wounded and stunned German soldiers. The attackers swept through the gaps in the German defences as Germans further back hurriedly withdrew. About  British troops advanced up the slope, the creeping bombardment throwing up lots of smoke and dust, which blocked the view of the German defenders. Where the Germans were able to resist, they were engaged with rifle-grenades, Lewis Guns and trench mortars, while riflemen and bombers worked behind them.

Pillbox fighting tactics had been a great success at the Battle of Vimy Ridge in April and in training for the attack at Messines, the same methods were adopted along with emphasis on mopping-up captured ground, to ensure that bypassed German troops could not engage advancing troops from behind. In the smoke and dust, direction was kept by compass and the German forward zone was easily overrun in the  allotted, as was the  line, half way to the German  on the ridge. The two supporting battalions of the attacking brigades leap-frogged through, to advance to the second objective on the near crest of the ridge  further on. The accuracy of the British barrage was maintained and local German counter-attack attempts were stifled. As the infantry approached the German second line, resistance increased.

Second objective (black line)
The New Zealand Division attacked Messines village, the southern bastion of the German defences on the ridge. The village had been fortified with a line of trenches around the outskirts and an inner defence zone comprising five pillboxes and all the house cellars, which had been converted into shellproof dugouts. The 25th Division took the Messines–Wytschaete road on the ridge, north of the New Zealand Division with little opposition except at Hell Farm, which was eventually overrun.

In the IX Corps area, the 36th (Ulster) Division captured the wreckage of two woods and Bogaert Farm in between, finding that the artillery fire had cut the masses of barbed wire and destroyed many strongpoints. A German force at L'Hospice held out despite being by-passed, until  and the objective was reached just after 

German positions at Dammstrasse, which ran from the St Eloi road to White Château, in the X Corps area, fell to the 41st Division after a long fight. White Château was attacked by the 47th Division as it advanced to the first objective, covered by smoke and Thermite shells fired on the German positions further to the north, along the Comines Canal. A German force at the head of the Zwarteleen re-entrant, south of Mt Sorrel where the two attacking brigades met, held out until forced to surrender by volleys of rifle-grenades.

German documents gleaned from the battlefield showed that they expected the forward crest of the ridge to be held until the  divisions arrived to counter-attack. There was a pause of two hours, for fresh battalions to move forward and the captured ground to be consolidated. About  beyond the forward positions, a protective bombardment by  swept back and forth, while the heavier artillery stood ready to respond with SOS barrages. Pack animals and men carrying Yukon packs, brought supplies into the captured ground and engineers supervised the digging and wiring of strongpoints. Most of the tanks still operational were outstripped but some caught up the infantry.

Fresh battalions of the New Zealand Division leap-frogged through the battalions which had attacked earlier, advancing either side of Messines, where some German posts still held out. A German artillery headquarters at Blauwen Molen (blue windmill),  beyond Messines, was captured and a tank broke into a strong point at Fanny's Farm, causing a hundred Germans to surrender. The reserve brigade of the 25th Division continued the advance to the north except at Lumm Farm, which was eventually taken with assistance from the right flank troops of the 36th (Ulster) Division. Helped by two tanks, the rest of the 36th (Ulster) Division advanced to the right of Wytschaete village and captured a German battalion headquarters. Wytschaete had been fortified like Messines but special bombardments fired on 3 June had demolished the village. Two battalions of the 16th (Irish) Division overran the German survivors and on the left, the reserve brigade of the 19th Division took the area from Wytschaete village to Oosttaverne Wood with little resistance.

X Corps had greater difficulty reaching some of its final objectives; the loss of White Château disorganised the German defenders adjacent to the south. The British attacks established a footing on the heap at great cost, due to machine-gun fire from the spoil heap and others in Battle Wood further north.

In the centre of the attack, a company from each battalion advanced behind the barrage, to an observation line several hundred yards down the east slope of the ridge, at  assisted by eight tanks and patrols of cavalry. Most German troops encountered surrendered quickly, except at Leg Copse and Oosttaverne Wood where they offered slight resistance. British aircraft added to German difficulties, with low-level machine-gun attacks. The second objective (the observation line) from Bethlehem Farm to south of Messines, Despagne Farm and Oosttaverne Wood, was reached with few casualties. Ground markers were put out for the three divisions due to attack in the afternoon and the area consolidated. The defensive frontages of the British units on the ridge had been based on an assumption that casualties in the advance to the first intermediate objective (blue line) would be  and in the advance to the ridge (black line) would be  There were far fewer British casualties than anticipated, which caused congestion on the ridge, where the attacking troops suffered considerable casualties from German long-range machine-gun and artillery fire. The masked batteries of the three reserve divisions were used to add to the protective barrage in front of the infantry but no Germans could be seen.

Final objective (Oosttaverne line)

A pause of five hours was considered necessary to defeat the German  divisions, before resuming the advance on the Oosttaverne line. The pause was extended by two hours to  after Plumer received reports on the state of the ground. More artillery joined the masked batteries close to the front line and others moved as far into no-man's-land as the terrain allowed. On the nearside of the ridge,  were prepared to fire an overhead barrage, and each division placed sixteen more guns in the observation line on the eastern slope. Surviving tanks of the morning attack in X Corps, were to join in from Damm and Denys woods.

The 4th Australian Division continued the attack on the II Anzac Corps front, the right hand brigade reaching the assembly areas by  before learning of the postponement. The right brigade advanced on a  front towards the Oosttaverne line, from the river Douve north to the Blauwepoortbeek (Blue Gate Brook). German machine-gunners in the pillboxes of the Oosttaverne line caused many casualties but with support from three tanks the Australians reached the pillboxes, except for those to the north of the Messines–Warneton road. As the Australians outflanked the strongpoints, the Germans tried to retreat through the British barrage, which had stopped moving  beyond the rear trench of the Oosttaverne line.

The left flank brigade was stopped on its right flank by fire from the German pillboxes north of the Messines–Warneton road up to the Blauwepoortbeek,  short of the Oosttaverne line, with many casualties. The left battalion, unaware that the 33rd Brigade (11th Division) to the north had been delayed, veered towards the north-east to try to make contact near Lumm Farm, which took the battalion across the Wambeke Spur instead of straight down. The brigade took Joye and Van Hove farms beyond the objective, silencing the machine-guns being fired from them.

On the IX Corps front, the 33rd Brigade (11th Division) had been ordered to advance to Vandamme Farm at  but the message was delayed and the troops did not reach the assembly area at Rommens Farm until  half an hour late. To cover the delay, the corps commander ordered the 57th Brigade (19th Division) from reserve, to take the Oosttaverne line from Van Hove Farm to Oosttaverne village then to Bug Wood, so that only the southern  were left for the 33rd Brigade. These orders were also delayed and the 19th Division commander asked for a postponement then ordered the 57th Brigade to advance without waiting for the 33rd Brigade. The troops only knew that they were to advance downhill and keep up to the barrage but were able to occupy the objective in  against light opposition, meeting the Australians at Polka Estaminet.

Two brigades of the 24th Division in Corps reserve advanced into the X Corps sector and reached Dammstrasse on time. The brigades easily reached their objectives around Bug Wood, Rose Wood and Verhaest Farm, taking unopposed many German pillboxes. The brigades captured  and six field guns for a loss of six casualties, advancing  along the Roozebeek valley, then took Ravine Wood unopposed on the left flank. The left battalion was drawn back to meet the 47th Division, which was still held up by machine-gun fire from the spoil bank. Despite a heavy bombardment until  the Germans at the spoil bank repulsed another infantry attack. The reserve battalion which had been moved up for the second attack on the spoil bank, had been caught in a German artillery bombardment while assembling for the attack. The companies which attacked then met with massed machine-gun fire during the advance and only advanced half way to the spoil bank. The  of the original  infantry, were withdrawn when German reinforcements were seen arriving from the canal cutting and no further attempts were made.

The situation near the Blauwepoortbeek worsened, when German troops were seen assembling near Steingast Farm, close to the Warneton road. A British SOS barrage fell on the 12th Australian Brigade, which was inadvertently digging-in  beyond its objective. The Australians stopped the German counter-attack with small-arms fire but many survivors began to withdraw spontaneously, until they stopped in relative safety on the ridge. As darkness fell and being under the impression that all the Australians had retired, New Zealand artillery observers called for the barrage to be brought closer to the observation line, when they feared a German counter-attack. The bombardment fell on the rest of the Australians, who withdrew with many casualties, leaving the southern part of the Oosttaverne line unoccupied, as well as the gap around the Blauwepoortbeek. An SOS barrage on the IX Corps front stopped a German counter-attack from the Roozebeke valley but many shells fell short, precipitating another informal withdrawal. Rumour led to the barrage being moved closer to the observation line, which added to British casualties until , when the infantry managed to get the artillery stopped and were then able to re-occupy the positions.

Air operations
As the infantry moved to the attack contact-patrol aircraft flew low overhead, two being maintained over each corps during the day. The observers were easily able to plot the positions of experienced troops, who lit flares and waved anything to attract attention. Some troops, poorly trained and inexperienced, failed to co-operate, fearing exposure to the Germans; aircraft flew dangerously low to identify them, four being shot down in consequence. Although air observation was not as vital to German operations because of their control of commanding ground, the speed by which reports from air observation could be delivered, made it a most valuable form of liaison between the front line and higher commanders. German infantry proved as reluctant to reveal themselves as the British and German flyers also had to make visual identifications. Reports and maps were dropped at divisional headquarters and corps report centres, allowing the progress of the infantry to be followed.

During the pause on the ridge crest, an observer reported that the Oosttaverne line was barely occupied; at  a balloon observer reported a German barrage on the II Anzac Corps front and a counter-attack patrol aircraft reported German infantry advancing either side of Messines. The German counter-attack was "crushed" by artillery fire by  Each corps squadron kept an aircraft on counter-attack patrol all day, to call for barrage fire if German troops were seen in the open but the speed of the British advance resulted in few German counter-attacks. Artillery observers watched for German gunfire and made  calls but only  to have German guns engaged. The observers regulated the bombardment of the Oosttaverne line and the artillery of VIII Corps to the north of the attack, which was able to enfilade German artillery opposite X Corps.

Fourteen fighters were sent to conduct low altitude  on German ground targets ahead of the British infantry and rove behind German lines, attacking infantry, transport, gun-teams and machine-gun nests; the attacks continued all day, two of the fighters being shot down. Organised attacks were made on the German airfields at Bisseghem and Marcke near Courtrai and the day bombing squadrons attacked airfields at Ramegnies Chin, Coucou, Bisseghem (again) and Rumbeke. Reports of German troops concentrating from Quesnoy to Warneton were received and aircraft set out to attack them within minutes. German fighters made a considerable effort to intercept corps observation aircraft over the battlefield but were frustrated by patrols on the barrage line and offensive patrols beyond; only one British corps aircraft was shot down by German aircraft. After dark, the night-bombing specialists of 100 Squadron bombed railway stations at Warneton, Menin and Courtrai. The situation at the north end of the II Anzac Corps front was discovered by air reconnaissance at dawn on 8 June.

German 4th Army 

At  on 7 June, the British artillery bombardment ceased; expecting an immediate infantry assault, the German defenders returned to their forward positions. At  the mines were detonated, killing  soldiers and destroying most of the middle breastwork Ib of the front system, paralysing the survivors of the eleven German battalions in the front line, who were swiftly overrun. The explosions occurred while some of the German front line troops were being relieved, catching both groups in the blasts and British artillery fire resumed at the same moment as the explosions.

After a pause, the British continued to the  held by half of the support battalions, a company of each reserve battalion and  machine-guns per regimental sector. Despite daylight, German defenders only saw occasional shapes in the dust and smoke as they were deluged by artillery fire and machine-gunned by swarms of British aircraft.

Laffert had expected that the two  divisions behind Messines Ridge would reach the  before the British. The 1st Guard Reserve Division was to move to the Warneton line east of Messines, then advance around Messines to recapture the original front system. Both  divisions were plagued by delays, being new to the area and untrained for counter-attack operations. The 7th Division was shelled by British artillery all the way to the Comines canal, then part of the division was diverted to reinforce the remnants of the front divisions holding positions around Hollebeke.

Laffert contemplated a further withdrawal, then ordered the existing line to be held after the British advance stopped. Most of the losses inflicted on the British infantry by the German defence came from artillery fire. In the days after the main attack, German shellfire on the new British lines was extremely accurate and well-timed, inflicting  the casualties suffered by the 25th Division.

Aftermath

Analysis

Historians and writers disagree on the strategic significance of the battle, although most describe it as a British tactical and operational success. In 1919, Ludendorff wrote that the British victory cost the German army dear and drained German reserves. Hindenburg wrote that the losses at Messines had been "very heavy" and that he regretted that the ground had not been evacuated; in 1922, Kuhl called it one of the worst German tragedies of the war. In his Dispatches of 1920, Haig described the success of the British plan, organisation and results but refrained from hyperbole, referring to the operation as a successful preliminary to the main offensive at Ypres. In 1930, Basil Liddell Hart thought the success at Messines inflated expectations for the Third Battle of Ypres and that because the circumstances of the operations were different, attempts to apply similar tactics resulted in failure. James Edmonds, the official historian, called it a "great victory" in Military Operations France and Belgium 1917 Part II, published 1948.

Prior and Wilson (1997) called the battle a "noteworthy success" but then complained about the decision to postpone exploitation of the success on the Gheluvelt plateau. Ashley Ekins referred to the battle as a great set-piece victory, which was also costly, particularly for the infantry of II Anzac Corps, as did Christopher Pugsley, referring to the experience of the New Zealand Division. Heinz Hagenlücke called it a great British success and that the loss of the ridge had a worse effect on German morale than the number of casualties. Jack Sheldon called it a "significant victory" for the British and a "disaster" for the German army, which was forced into a "lengthy period of anxious waiting". Ian Brown in his 1996 PhD thesis and Andy Simpson in 2001 concluded that extending British supply routes over the ridge, which had been devastated by the mines and millions of shells, to consolidate the Oosttaverne line was necessary. Completion of the infrastructure further north in the Fifth Army area, had to wait before the Northern Operation (Third Battle of Ypres) could begin and was the main reason for the operational pause in June and July.

Casualties

In 1948, James Edmonds, the British official historian, gave casualties of  the II Anzac Corps,  IX Corps,  X Corps,  II Corps and  VIII Corps, a total of  1 to 12 June. The 25th Division history gave  and the 47th Division history notes .

In volume XII of  the German Official Historians recorded  for the period  including  of whom  reported as taken prisoner by the British. The explosion of the mines, in particular the mine that created the Lone Tree Crater, accounts for the high number of casualties and missing from 1 to 10 June. The German medical history, Sanitätsbericht über das Deutschen Heeres im Weltkrieg (Medical Services of the German Army in the World War) [1934], recorded 26,087 German casualties from 7 to 14 June.

In 2007 Sheldon gave  for the German 4th Army from 1 to 10 June 1917.

Subsequent operations

At  on 8 June, the British attack to regain the Oosttaverne line from the river Douve to the Warneton road found few German garrisons present as it was occupied. German artillery south of the Lys bombarded the southern slopes of the ridge and caused considerable losses among Anzac troops pinned there. Ignorance of the situation north of the Warneton road continued; a reserve battalion was sent to reinforce the 49th Australian Battalion near the Blauwepoortbeek for the  attack, which did not take place.

New orders instructed the 33rd Brigade, 11th (Northern) Division, to side-step to the right and relieve the 52nd Australian Battalion, which at dusk would move to the south and join the 49th Australian Battalion to attack into the gap at the Blauwepoortbeek. All went well until observers on the ridge saw the 52nd Australian Battalion withdrawing, mistook it for a German counter-attack and called for an SOS bombardment. German observers in the valley saw troops from the 33rd Brigade moving into the area to relieve the Australians, mistook them for an attacking force and also called for an SOS bombardment. The area was deluged with artillery fire from both sides for two hours, causing many casualties and the attack was postponed until 9 June.

Confusion had been caused by the original attacking divisions on the ridge having control over the artillery covering the area occupied by the reserve divisions down the eastern slope. The arrangement had been intended to protect the ridge from large German counter-attacks, which might force the reserve divisions back up the slope. The mistaken bombardments of friendly troops ended late on 9 June, when the New Zealand, 16th (Irish) and 36th (Ulster) divisions were withdrawn into reserve and the normal corps organisation was restored; the anticipated large German counter-attacks had not occurred.

The 3rd Australian Division advanced  either side of the river Douve, consolidating their hold on a rise around Thatched Cottage, which secured the right flank of the new Messines position; early on 11 June, the Germans evacuated the Blauwepoortbeek sector. British observation from the Oosttaverne line proved to be poor, which led Plumer to order an advance further down the slope. IX Corps was to take Joye Farm, the Wambeke hamlet and come level with the Australians at Delporte Farm; X Corps was to capture the Spoil Bank and the areas adjacent.

Meticulously planned and well executed, the attack on the Messines–Wytschaete ridge secured its objectives in less than twelve hours. The combination of tactics devised on the Somme and at Arras, the use of mines, artillery survey, creeping barrages, tanks, aircraft and small-unit fire-and-movement tactics, created a measure of surprise and allowed the attacking infantry to advance by infiltration when confronted by intact defences. Well-organised mopping-up parties prevented by-passed German troops from firing on advanced troops from behind. The British took    and  The offensive secured the southern end of the Ypres salient in preparation for the British Northern Operation.

Haig had discussed the possibility of rapid exploitation of a victory at Messines with Plumer before the attack, arranging for II and VIII Corps to advance either side of Bellewaarde Lake, using some of the artillery from the Messines front, which Plumer considered would take three days to transfer. On 8 June, patrols on the II and VIII Corps fronts reported strong resistance. Haig urged Plumer to attack immediately and Plumer replied that it would still take three days to arrange. Haig transferred the two corps to the Fifth Army and that evening, gave instructions to Gough to plan the preliminary operation to capture the area around Stirling Castle. On 14 June, Gough announced that the operation would put his troops into a salient and that he wanted to take the area as part of the main offensive. On 13 June, German aircraft began daylight attacks on London and the south-east of England, leading to the diversion of British aircraft from the concentration of air forces for the Northern Operation.

Victoria Cross

 Private John Carroll, 33rd Battalion, 3rd Australian Division.
 Lance-Corporal Samuel Frickleton, 3rd Battalion, New Zealand Rifles, New Zealand Division.
 Captain Robert Cuthbert Grieve, 37th Battalion, 3rd Australian Division.
 Private William Ratcliffe, 2nd South Lancashire Regiment, 25th Division.

See also 

 List of the largest artificial non-nuclear explosions
 Mines in the Battle of Messines (1917)
 Ronald Skirth, British pacifist artilleryman, vowed not to take another human life after the Battle of Messines

Notes

References

Citations

Bibliography 

Books
 
 
 
 
 
 
 
 
 
 
 
 
 
 
 
 
 
 
 
 
 
 
 
 
 
 
 

Journals
 
 

Theses
 
 

Websites

Further reading

External links 

 Order of Battle – France and Flanders 1917, Battle # 98 – Order of Battle for the Battle of Messines
 Tommy's Gazetteer of French and Belgian Place Names 
 "Plug Street Project": Report on Archaeological Excavations in St Yvon area. 2007
 The Plugstreet Archaeology Project

1917 in Belgium
1917 in France
Explosions in 1917
Battle of Passchendaele
Battles of the Western Front (World War I)
Battles of World War I involving Australia
Battles of World War I involving Belgium
Battles of World War I involving Germany
Battles of World War I involving New Zealand
Battles of World War I involving the United Kingdom
Conflicts in 1917
Ypres Salient
Tunnel warfare in World War I
Battle honours of the Rifle Brigade
June 1917 events
Battles in Flanders
Battle